Say It Loud may refer to:

Say It Loud (Sanctus Real album)
Say It Loud (GRiZ album)
Say It Loud!, an album by Lou Donaldson
"Say It Loud" (Noah's Arc), an episode of Noah's Arc
"Say It Loud – I'm Black and I'm Proud", a song by James Brown